Artur Kaskov (born 18 November 1991) is a professional Ukrainian football striker.

External links
 Profile at Official FFU Site 

1991 births
Living people
Footballers from Zaporizhzhia
Ukrainian footballers
FC Metalurh Zaporizhzhia players
FC Chornomorets Odesa players
FC Olimpik Donetsk players
FC Bukovyna Chernivtsi players
FC Poltava players
Ukrainian Premier League players
PFC Sumy players
NK Veres Rivne players
FC Tavria-Skif Rozdol players
Association football forwards